Azonto is a dance and music genre from Ghana. Ghana News Agency cites their  study which found out the dance is connected to the traditional Ga dance Kpanlogo, associated with the coastal towns in the country such as Chorkor, James Town, Teshie, Nungua and Tema, in the Greater Accra Region.

Several accounts say Azonto was formerly known as 'Apaa' in these communities. The Apaa dance, hence Azonto dance, involves a set of hand movements that either mimic everyday activities especially ones concerning people's livelihoods, or moves that are meant to amuse an audience.

It began with one- or two-step movements but has been advanced to more complex and almost acrobatic movements. Just like most African dances, Azonto involves knee bending and hip movements. The dance has effectively evolved from a few basic moves to miming actions such as ironing of clothes, washing, driving, boxing, praying, swimming, and others.

History
Azonto is a communicative dance believed to originate from "Apaa" which literally means to work. Apaa was used to show the profession of an individual. The azonto dance has since grown further to relay coded messages.
The dance later got into the minds of most Ghanaians. In the same year (2013), most Ghanaian music videos were full of Azonto dance and later spread to most African countries and other parts of the world.

Popular music researcher Jesse Weaver Shipley claims that like hiplife, the popularity of Azonto is a direct result of its interactions in diaspora.  Azonto is identified with Ghanaian indigeneity by those abroad and with cosmopolitanism by those at home"

International popularity
Azonto can be traced as far back as one of R2Bees upcoming songs "Azonto" but was rejuvenated by  Guru's Lapaz Toyota and later the producer NshonnaMusick with the song "You Go Kill Me" which had Sarkodie (rapper) and EL (rapper) on it. It was later  popularized on social media by the music videos that portrayed the dance form with fast-pace tempos, home-made dance instructional videos uploaded on YouTube with no commercial intent, and group choreographers done by mostly Ghanaians and other African nationals living in UK, Germany and U.S.

The widespread popularity of Azonto highlights the presence of social mobility within Ghanaian, and to an extent, the greater African culture. Specifically, how digital media functions as a modality of production and sociality. Azonto is emblematic of a larger social media trend, one that emphasizes the transient nature of artistic output, this in stark contrast to older discourses of identity and nationhood. Whereas these discourses maintain physical location, or place-based culture as proof of belonging, younger generations articulate a sense of belonging through shared cultural signifiers, like Azonto, that spread through digital media. Thus, Azonto can travels throughout space and time while becoming detached from one physical location.

Tracks

See also

 Alkayida

References

African dances
Ghanaian music
African electronic dance music